Severe weather phenomena are weather conditions that are hazardous to human life and property.

Severe weather can occur under a variety of situations, but three characteristics are generally needed: a temperature or moisture boundary, moisture, and (in the event of severe, precipitation-based events) instability in the atmosphere.

Examples

Atmospheric
 Fog
 Haar (fog)
 Ice fog

Electrical storms
 Storms
 Thunderstorms
 Multicellular thunderstorm
 Pulse storm
 Squall line 
 Storm cell (single-cell)
 Supercells, rotating thunderstorms

Fire
 Wildfire or bushfire (ignition of wildfires is sometimes by lightning strike, especially in "dry thunderstorms")
 Firestorm
 Fire whirl, also called firenado and fire tornado

Flooding
 Floods
 Flash floods
 Coastal flooding 
 Tidal flooding

Oceans and bodies of water
 Harmful algal bloom
 Blue green algae
 Red tide
 High seas
 High tides
 king tide
 Ice shove
 Rogue wave 
 Seiche 
 Swell (ocean)
 Tidal surge
 Rip currents 
 Undertow (water waves)
 Whirlpools

Precipitation

Snow
 Avalanche
 Blizzard
 Lake effect snow
 Snownado
 Snow devil

Ice
 Black ice
 Glaze ice
 Hailstorm
 Ice shove
 Ice storm
 Megacryometeor

Rain
 Acid rain
 Blood rain
 Cold drop (archaic as a meteorological term), colloquially, any high impact rainfall event along the Mediterranean coast of Spain
 Drought, a prolonged water supply shortage, often caused by persistent lack of, or much reduced, rainfall 
 Floods
 Flash flood
 Rainstorm
 Red rain in Kerala (for related phenomena, see Blood rain)

Surface movement
 Avalanche
 Mass wasting and landslips
 Landslide
 Mudslide
 Rockfall

Thermal
 Cold wave
 Heat wave
 Heat burst
  humidity

Wind
 Cyclones
 Extratropical cyclone
 European windstorms
 "Medicane", Mediterranean tropical-like cyclones
 Polar cyclone
 Tropical cyclone, also called a hurricane, typhoon, or just "cyclone"
 Subtropical cyclone
 Explosive cyclogenesis or weather bomb
 Dust storm 
 Haboob 
 Dust devil
 Sandstorm
 Hurricane
  Katabatic winds
 Bohemian wind
 Bora 
 Gregale
 Santa Ana winds
 Gale
 Monsoon
 Nor’easter
 Nor'westers
 Steam devil
 Squall
 Straight-line winds
 Derecho 
 Tornado (also colloquially referred to as a "whirlwind" or "twister")
 Landspout
 Gustnado, a "gust front tornado"
 Waterspout
 Winter storms
 Wind gust
Windstorm

Other
 Heat lightning
 Zud, widespread livestock death, mainly by starvation, caused by climatic conditions

Some related meteorological terms:

Phenomena caused by severe thunderstorms 
 Extreme wind (70 mph or greater)
 Downpours
 Heavy rain
 Flood, flash flood, coastal flooding
 Hail
 High winds – 93 km/h(58 mph) or higher.
 Lightning 
 Thundersnow, Snowsquall
 Tornado
 Windstorm (gradient pressure induced)
 Severe thunderstorm (hailstorm, downburst: microbursts and macrobursts)

See also 
 Extreme weather
 List of weather-related phenomena
 Meteorology
 Severe weather terminology (United States)
 Space weather

 

Lists of natural disasters
Glossaries of meteorology
Wikipedia glossaries using unordered lists

de:Unwetter
ja:荒天